Sparganothoides coloratana is a species of moth of the family Tortricidae. It is found in Chihuahua, Mexico.

The length of the forewings is 9.9–10.8 mm for males and 9.6–11.4 mm for females. The ground colour of the forewings is pale brown to yellowish brown, with scattered brown and brownish grey scales. The hindwings are grey.

Etymology
The species name refers to the dark, smoky appearance and is derived from coloro (meaning to give tone or color).

References

Moths described in 2009
Sparganothoides